Delta Air Lines is a major United States airline based in Atlanta, Georgia. As of December 31, 2021, Delta mainline aircraft fly to 242 destinations serving 52 countries across six continents. The airline has nine domestic hubs.

Destinations 
Delta Air Lines has flown to the cities below; the table does not show cities that have only seen Delta Connection flights.

See also
 List of Delta Connection destinations

References 

Lists of airline destinations
Destinations
SkyTeam destinations